Rangemore, Queensland may refer to:

 Rangemore, Queensland (Burdekin Shire)
 Rangemore, Queensland (Toowoomba Region)